Aleksei Yevgenyevich Savchenko (born 14 May 1975) is a former Russian professional footballer.

Club career
He made his professional debut in the Russian Second Division in 1992 for FC Dynamo-d Moscow.

Honours
 Russian Premier League bronze: 1992, 1993.

European club competitions
With FC Dynamo Moscow.

 UEFA Cup 1992–93: 2 games.
 UEFA Cup 1993–94: 1 game.

References

1975 births
Footballers from Moscow
Living people
Russian footballers
Association football midfielders
Russia youth international footballers
FC Dynamo Moscow players
Russian Premier League players
FC Tyumen players
FC Khimki players